The 2021 Rugby League World Cup is a collection of world cups in the sport of rugby league being held in England from 15 October 2022 to 19 November 2022.

The 2021 Rugby League World Cup may also refer to:
 2021 Men's Rugby League World Cup, the 16th staging of the Men's competition
 2021 Women's Rugby League World Cup, the 6th staging of the Women's competition
 2021 Wheelchair Rugby League World Cup, the 4th staging of the Wheelchair competition
 2021 Physical Disability Rugby League World Cup, the inaugural world cup for physical disability rugby league

The 2021 Rugby League World Cup may additionally refer to:

Finals 
 2021 Men's Rugby League World Cup Final
 2021 Women's Rugby League World Cup Final
 2021 Wheelchair Rugby League World Cup Final
 2021 Physical Disability Rugby League World Cup Final

Group stages 
 2021 Men's Rugby League World Cup Group A
 2021 Men's Rugby League World Cup Group B
 2021 Men's Rugby League World Cup Group C
 2021 Men's Rugby League World Cup Group D
 2021 Women's Rugby League World Cup Group A
 2021 Women's Rugby League World Cup Group B
 2021 Wheelchair Rugby League World Cup Group A
 2021 Wheelchair Rugby League World Cup Group B
 2021 Physical Disability Rugby League World Cup group stage

Knockout rounds 
 2021 Men's Rugby League World Cup knockout stage
 2021 Women's Rugby League World Cup knockout stage
 2021 Wheelchair Rugby League World Cup knockout stage
 2021 Physical Disability Rugby League World Cup knockout stage

See also 
 2021 Rugby League World Cup qualifying (disambiguation)
 2021 Rugby League World Cup squads (disambiguation)
 World cup of rugby (disambiguation)
 Rugby (disambiguation)